The Royal Aircraft Factory N.E.1 was a prototype British Night fighter of the First World War.  A single-engined pusher biplane, it was a development of the Royal Aircraft Factory's earlier F.E.9 fighter, but was not successful, only six being built.

Development and design
In 1917, the British Royal Aircraft Factory started design of a night fighter development of its F.E.9, the F.E.12.  This used the tailbooms, undercarriage and wing centre-sections of the F.E.9, combining them with new, three-bay outer wings and a larger tailplane.  It was to be armed with a shell firing gun and equipped with two searchlights.  The design was revised to produce the N.E.1 (for Night-flying Experimental), with revised wings, new tailbooms and a new, wide track, undercarriage.

The first prototype N.E.1 flew on 8 September 1917. It was fitted with a single searchlight in the nose, and with the pilot and gunner sat in tandem, with the pilot seated in front to give a good view. The gunner was to be armed with a 1.59-inch (40-mm) Breech-Loading Vickers Q.F. Gun, Mk II—widely known as the "Vickers-Crayford rocket gun," although it had no rocket-launching capability—or a 1 lb COW gun, and a radio was fitted.  It was powered by a 200 hp (149 kW) Hispano-Suiza 8 engine in a pusher configuration driving a four-bladed propeller. Its three-bay equal span wings were fitted with ailerons on both upper and lower wings, while the elevators had large horn balances (the amount of control surface forward of the hinge).

The first prototype crashed on 14 September 1917, and was rebuilt with a new nacelle with the searchlight removed, and the gunner, who was armed with a 1.59-inch (40-mm) Breech-Loading Vickers Q.F. Gun, Mk II, moved ahead of the pilot.  A fixed Lewis gun was mounted externally on the starboard side of the fuselage, to be operated by the pilot. It flew in this form on 4 October 1917.

Although testing indicated that the N.E.1 was easy to fly and land, and had excellent field of fire for the gunner, the official test report noted "It is doubtful if the performance of this machine is good enough to make it suitable as a night fighter".  Despite this, all six prototypes were completed, with the second prototype being sent to No. 78 Squadron, while several of the other aircraft were used for trials.

Operators

Royal Flying Corps
No. 78 Squadron RFC

Specifications

See also

Notes

References

Bruce, J. M. British Aeroplanes 1914-18. London: Putnam, 1957. 
Bruce, J. M. War Planes of the First World War: Volume Two Fighters. London: Macdonald, 1968. .
Lewis, Peter. The British Fighter since 1912. London: Putnam, 1979. .
Mason, Francis K. The British Fighter since 1912. Annapolis, Maryland, USA: Naval Institute Press, 1992. .
Williams, Anthony G., and Gustin, Emmanuel. Flying Guns: World War I and its Aftermath 1914-32. Ramsbury, UK: Airlife, 2003. . 

1910s British fighter aircraft
NE1
Aircraft first flown in 1917